The Ćelije Monastery ( is a Serbian Orthodox monastery dedicated to St. Archangel Michael. It was founded in the late 13th century. Today, monastery is surrounded with tall trees, so cannot be seen from far.

It is best known by being the monastery of saint Justin Popović, (1894–1979), who was canonized by the Serbian Orthodox Church in 2010.

Ćelije Monastery was declared Monument of Culture of Great Importance in 1979, and it is protected by Republic of Serbia.

Position

The monastery is located 6 km southwest of Valjevo , on the left bank of the Gradac River. The monastery is located in a hilly area belonging to the atelier of the village of Lelić . Gradac is a sinking river, springing from the foot of Povlen Mountain. After a few kilometers it goes underground, to appear again near the village of Bogatići, above the Ćelije Monastery. From Bogatići, the river runs through a winding gorge all the way down to the monastery.

History

The exact time of the monastery's origin is unknown, but according to general historical data, the monastery dates from the Middle Ages. Ćelije Monastery is dedicated to St. Archangel Michael.

It is not known who built the monastery, nor when. The monastery is believed to have been founded by Serbian king Stefan Dragutin, who reigned this area from 1282 to 1316.

A local legend has it that three brothers of the Nemanjići royal dynasty built three monasteries in this area: Ćelije, Jovanje and Pustinja.

However, the monastery was most likely founded during the reign of Despot Stefan Lazarević (1389–1427) in the times of social and religious revival of Western Serbia. At the time, the town of Valjevo was the residence of the metropolitan bishop, while the main church was in the Ćelije Monastery.

Ottoman period and liberated Serbia
In the Ottoman days, Ćelije Monastery was demolished and burned down several times, and each time rebuilt in the same spot. The most famous priests of that period were Danilo Vukašinović, who took part in the meeting of Serbian leaders in Belgrade in 1733, famous Hadži-Ruvim and others.  Celije Monastery, as a monastery near the village of Lelić, was mentioned in Turkish sources in 1560, and throughout the eighteenth century, Celije was the center of all activities of the Valjevo region. The eminent monks of this monastery played a large part in the uprising of the rebellion against the Turks, which is why the infamous Pasha of Bušatlija in early 1791 set fire to the Ćelija monastery, together with 13 churches in the Valjevo region. In this monastery, the priesthood rank was also given to Hadži-Ruvim.

In the first half of the 18th century, Serbs lined with Austrians who were subsequently defeated by the Turks. Serbian people migrated to the north, led by archbishop Arsenije IV Jovanović. In 1739, near Ćelije Monastery, a few thousand Serbian families were massacred by the Turks. Since then, the nearby village has been known under the name "Lelići" or "Leleci" ("lelek" meaning lament, mourning, cry of despair).
In the second half of the 18th century, the monks of Celije Monastery took part in the uprising led by Koča Kapetan, which was the reason why the Turks burned the monastery to the ground in 1791. Soon after that, the monastery was rebuilt by the Serbs again. In that time the hegumen of the monastery was Hadži–Ruvim.

In 1804 the clergy of Celije Monastery took part in organizing the First Serbian uprising led by Karađorđe Petrović. In the monastery is the grave of Duke Ilija Birčanin, killed by the Turks in 1804 along with other prominent Serbian leaders.

In 1810 the Turks burned the monastery down once again, but the Serbs rebuilt it in 1811, with the help of rich Orthodox Armenians from Valjevo. The main dome was built in the Armenian style after the wish of one of the Armenian benefactors.

From 1804 to 1813 Ćelije Monastery housed Karađorđe’s military hospital. Later, in Miloš Obrenović’s liberated Serbia, the elementary boarding school operated in the monastery. The school was also attended by bishop Nikolaj Velimirović, later Serbian Orthodox bishop and writer.

20th century

During the World War I the Austrians demolished monastery, but it was soon rebuilt just to be demolished again in World War II. After the war the monastery was rebuilt by nuns, who found a large number of old bones in the ground, dating from different periods.

Famost priest and theologist dr. Justin Popović lived in the Ćelije monastery from 1948 until his death 1979. Nicknamed Ave Justin, he was the author of a number of theological works and one of the founders of the Serbian Philosophical Society.

Present day

In honour of the eight centuries of autocephaly of the Serbian Orthodox Church, on the day of the celebration St. Joachim and Anna 22 September 2019 and the 125th anniversary since the birth and 40 years since the death of famous cleric Saint Justin of Ćelije in monastery complex was consecrated new the three-altar church by a number of Serbian bishops, clergy and monks of the Serbian Orthodox Church, as well as representatives of other Eastern Orthodox Churches and thousands of Orthodox believers.

Attractions

The church of Ćelije Monastery, dedicated to the archangels Michael and Gabriel, has a basis in form of a byzantine basilica. The ceiling is 11 meters high, and the nine-sided dome symbolizes nine archbishop ranks. The last restoration of the dome took place in 1936.

The oldest icon in the monastery is the icon of the Holy Archangels, dating back to 1798, when it was given to the monastery, and the oldest book was a gift by Montenegrin bishop Danilo I, Metropolitan of Cetinje in 1715.

The oldest book in the monastery is the Divine Tabernacle (in the records it is called Skrižali ), bought by Montenegrin Bishop Danilo Petrovic in 1715 in Russia, and then donated to the monastery. The very old books include two mines for the months of March and November, and according to the printing method, the very small format and the records, both mines date from the first decades of the eighteenth century at the latest, and are assumed to have been printed in Venice. The Great Belt was printed in Russia in the second half of the eighteenth century, and became the property of the monastery around 1814. There is another book of historical value in the monastery, which is the Old Testament Scripture in the Church Slavonic language, which once belonged to Matija Nenadović.

Today, the printing and icon-writing activity is active in the monastery.

Pilgrimage site

The monastery is known for having lived in it the Archimandrite Dr. Justin Popović ( 1894–1979 ), St. Ava Justin, the Great Lighthouse of Ćelija, All-Serb and All-Orthodox, whose grave is on the south side of the altar, and by whose wish, the tomb has no other monument except for this stone cross and flowers on the mound.

On the left side of the church towards the altar, just behind the north door, is the tomb of Ilija Birčanin , Duke of Podgorica, the ruins of the duke beneath Medvednik , who were cut down on the Kolubara parish in Valjevo in 1804 , together with the Duke of Valjevo.

The new three-altars temple dedicated to Saint Sava, Saint Justin Martyr and Saint Mary of Egypt is consecrated in September 2019. The relics of Saint Justin of Ćelije were ceremoniously transferred from small to the newly built church at the opening of the new temple.

See also 
 Monuments of Culture of Great Importance
 Tourism in Serbia
 Stephen Dragutin of Serbia

External links 

 Official site
 Ćelije Monastery on www.discoverserbia.org

References 

 Regional Chamber of Commerce Požarevac, prepared by Dr. Novaković Radmila Kostić, 2005.

 

Valjevo
Medieval Serbian Orthodox monasteries
Christian monasteries established in the 13th century
13th-century Serbian Orthodox church buildings
Cultural Monuments of Great Importance (Serbia)
Serbian Orthodox monasteries in Serbia
13th-century establishments in Serbia
Medieval sites in Serbia